Simonov, or Simonova (feminine; Си́монова), is a Russian surname. Notable people with the surname include:

Andrey Simonov (born 1966), a Russian major general
Andrey Simonov (born 1971), a Russian aviation historian
Ivan Simonov (1794–1855), Russian astronomer
Konstantin Simonov (1915–1979), Soviet poet
Kseniya Simonova (born 1985), Ukrainian artist
Matvey Simonov (1823–1900) Ukrainian ethnographer, folklorist and writer
Mikhail Simonov (1929–2011), Russian aircraft designer
Mikhail Yuryevich Simonov (born 1959), Russian direct marketing pioneer and personified communications expert
Nikolai Simonov (1901–1973), Soviet actor
Ruben Simonov (1899–1968), Soviet actor and film director
Sergei Gavrilovich Simonov (1894–1986), Soviet weapons designer
Sergei Sergeyevich Simonov (born 1983), Russian footballer
Yevgeniya Simonova (born 1955), Russian actress, People's Artist of Russia
Yuri Simonov (born 1941), Russian conductor

See also
2426 Simonov, asteroid
Natalya Simonova, fictional character (and Bond girl) in GoldenEye
Simonov Monastery, famous monastery in Moscow
SKS, the most well known weapon designed by Sergei Simonov

See also
Semyonov (disambiguation)

Russian-language surnames
Surnames from given names